The 2013–14 season was Zavrč's first season in the Slovenian PrvaLiga, Slovenian top division.

Competitions

League

Standings

Matches

Cup

First round

Round of 16

Transfers

In

Out

Top goalscorers

See also
2013–14 Slovenian PrvaLiga
2013–14 Slovenian Cup

Zavrc